Trauma is a 1962 American film directed by Robert M. Young and starring Lynn Bari and John Conte.

Plot  
Eight years after her aunt Helen Garrison is killed, newlywed niece Emmaline and husband Warren return to the home where Helen died, where Emmaline tries to recall events from that fateful night that her mind has blacked out.

Suspicious figures lurk throughout the house, and even Warren ends up placed under arrest by treasury agents. It ultimately turns out that Luther, a caretaker, committed one murder years ago, then killed eyewitness Helen to ensure her silence.

Cast 
John Conte as Warren Clyner
Lynn Bari as Helen Garrison
Lorrie Richards as Emmaline Garrison
David Garner as Craig Schoonover
Warren J. Kemmerling as Luther
William Bissell as Thaddeus Hall
Bond Blackman as Robert
William Justine as Treasury Agent
Ray Lennert as Treasury Agent
Renee Mason as Carla
Robert Totten as Gas Station Attendant
Alfred Chafe as Police Officer
Ruby Borner as Maid

Soundtrack 
 "Emmaline's Theme" (Written by Buddy Collette and Minette Allton)

External links 

1962 films
American black-and-white films
1962 horror films
1960s English-language films